The 1991 ACB Playoffs was the final phase of the 1990–91 ACB season. It started on Wednesday, April 3, 1991, and run until Saturday, May 19, 1991.

First round
The first round were best-of-3 series.

Montigalà Joventut vs. DYC Breogán

Montigalà Joventut won the series 2-0

At. Madrid Villalba vs. Valvi Girona

At. Madrid Villalba won the series 2-0

Taugrés vs. Pamesa Valencia

Taugrés won the series 2-0

Real Madrid Otaysa vs. Caja Ronda

Real Madrid Otaysa won the series 2-0

Estudiantes Caja Postal vs. Caixa Ourense

Estudiantes Caja Postal won the series 2-0

CAI Zaragoza vs. Huesca La Magia

CAI Zaragoza won the series 2-0

Fórum Valladolid vs. Mayoral Maristas

Fórum Valladolid won the series 2-0

FC Barcelona vs. Caja San Fernando

FC Barcelona won the series 2-0

Quarterfinals
The quarterfinals were best-of-3 series.

Montigalà Joventut vs. At. Madrid Villalba

Montigalà Joventut won the series 2-0.

Real Madrid Otaysa vs. Taugrés

Taugrés won the series 2-0

Estudiantes Caja Postal vs. CAI Zaragoza

Estudiantes Caja Postal won the series 2-0

FC Barcelona vs. Fórum Valladolid

FC Barcelona won the series 2-1

Semifinals
The semifinals were best-of-5 series.

Montigalà Joventut vs. Taugrés

Montigalà Joventut won the series 3-1

FC Barcelona vs. Estudiantes Caja Postal

FC Barcelona won the series 3-1

Finals
The finals was a best-of-5 series.

Montigalà Joventut vs. FC Barcelona

Montigalà Joventut won the series 3-1

ACB Finals MVP:  Corny Thompson

References
ACB.com

Liga ACB playoffs
Playoffs